Hindus for Human Rights is a U.S.-based non-profit advocacy group founded in 2019. The organization supports pluralism, civil rights, and human rights in South Asia and North America and focuses on providing a Hindu voice of resistance to caste, Hindutva, racism, and all forms of bigotry and oppression.

History 
The organization was founded in the summer of 2019 in the wake of Narendra Modi's re-election as Prime Minister of India. It was co-founded by Sunita Viswanath, Raju Rajagopal, Deepak Gupta, Sapthagiri Iyengar, Sunil Sakhalkar, and Punya Upadhyaya. Advisory board members of Hindus for Human Rights include Rajmohan Gandhi, T.M. Krishna, Martin Macwan, Faisal Khan, Linda Hess, Swara Bhaskar, and Khalid Anis Ansari.

Advocacy 
Hindus for Human Rights has protested against the Howdy Modi rally in 2019 and the Citizenship Amendment Act. HfHR has also organized press conferences and webinars in support of former and current activists and political prisoners in India including Sanjiv Bhatt, Umar Khalid, Anand Teltumbde, Sudha Bharadwaj, and the late Father Stan Swamy.

In April 2022, Hindus for Human Rights compiled a statement asking Hindus around the world to break the "collective silence and speak out" against Hindutva-fuelled hate and violence against Muslims in India.

References 

Human rights organizations
2019 establishments in the United States
Civic and political organizations of the United States